The Atlantic Cup is the first and only dedicated Class40 professional sailing race in the United States. It consists of both offshore and inshore legs and was created by Manuka Sports Event Management, which is headquartered in Newport, Rhode Island.

Hugh Piggin, a New Zealand native and sailor who lives in Newport, was intent on changing the face of sailing in the United States. After joining forces with Julianna Barbieri, a sports broadcasting professional, the two created a business plan that would eventually form the Atlantic Cup.
The first edition of the race was in 2011. Entrants started in New York City and finished in Newport, with an additional inshore series that was also held in Newport. The race expanded in 2012 to start from Charleston, South Carolina.

The Atlantic Cup competition has three stages: two offshore legs and an inshore series. From 2011-2014, the first stage was a 648 nautical mile double-handed leg from Charleston to New York City. The second stage was a 231 nautical mile leg from New York City to Newport. The third and final stage was sailed with a maximum crew of six for a weekend-long inshore series. Beginning in 2016, the Atlantic Cup extended the Leg 2 course to 360 nautical miles with a finish in Portland, Maine. Points are awarded for each race, and the team with the fewest overall combined points from both the offshore and inshore series is crowned Atlantic Cup Champion. 

The 2012 race was the first carbon neutral sailing race in the United States. To achieve carbon neutrality, race organizers adopted a 3-part approach: on-land, on-water, and education. On land, single-use plastic water bottles are prohibited. Only glassware or biodegradable cups are used, and recycle stations and water filtration systems for both crew members and guests alike are set up in all three race locations. Event management uses only "100% post-consumer recycled paper" that is utilized for the printing of collateral material such as event packets, tickets, and handouts. In 2016, the Atlantic Cup was the first sporting event in the United States to be ISO 20121 compliant.

2016 Race Results

2014 Race Results

2013 Race Results

2012 Race Results

2011 Race Results

References 

Sailing competitions in the United States
Recurring sporting events established in 2011